An Englishwoman's Love-letters is a 1900 novel by Laurence Housman, initially published anonymously.  It was a scandal in its time due to its frankness, which excitement turned to disappointment as the public learned the author was no Englishwoman but Housman.  One year later, in 1901, a parody of the book, entitled Another Englishwoman's Love-letters and written by Barry Pain, was published by T. Fisher Unwin.

Winston Churchill wrote a P.S. in a letter of 22 January 1901 to his mother, Lady Randolph Churchill: "I have been reading 'An English Woman's Love Letters' Are all Mothers the same?"

References

Sources

External links

 
 

1900 British novels
English fantasy novels
Works published anonymously